The Style Council were a British band formed in late 1982 by Paul Weller, the former singer, songwriter and guitarist with the punk rock/new wave/mod revival band the Jam, and keyboardist Mick Talbot, previously a member of Dexys Midnight Runners, the Bureau and the Merton Parkas. The band enabled Weller to take his music in a more soulful direction.

The permanent line-up grew to include drummer Steve White and Weller's then-girlfriend, vocalist Dee C. Lee. Other artists such as Tracie Young, Tracey Thorn (Everything but the Girl), and drummer/percussionist Steve Sidelnyk (who has played for Madonna, Seal, Richard Ashcroft) also performed and collaborated with the group. As with Weller's previous band, most of the London-based group's hits were in their homeland, where they scored seven top 10 hits. The band also had hit singles and albums in Australia and New Zealand during the 1980s.

History

Formation and early releases 
The band was founded in late 1982 by Paul Weller and initially consisted only of himself and Mick Talbot, who Weller said he chose because "he shares my hatred of the rock myth and the rock culture". The band showed a diversity of musical styles. Singles "Speak Like a Child" (with its loud soul-influenced style), the extended funk of "Money-Go-Round", and the synth-ballad "Long Hot Summer" all featured Talbot on keyboards and organ, and reached number 4, number 11 and number 3 respectively on the UK Singles Chart. Near the end of 1983, these songs were compiled on Introducing The Style Council, a mini-album initially released in the US, Canada, Japan, and the Netherlands only. The Dutch version was heavily imported to the United Kingdom. In November 1983 the single "A Solid Bond in Your Heart" reached number 11 on the UK singles chart.

Café Bleu 
In February 1984 the single "My Ever Changing Moods" became their third Top 10 hit on the UK Singles Chart, peaking at number 5. The debut album Café Bleu, released a month later, entered the UK Albums Chart at number 2. A mixture of many styles including jazz, soul, pop and funk, featuring guest vocalists and not including any of the previous singles (except a different version of "My Ever Changing Moods") it left some fans confused and critics divided. Still, the album spent 36 weeks on the chart and was followed by two further Top 10 singles, "You're the Best Thing" in May and "Shout to the Top" in October.

In 1984, the band undertook a brief tour of the United States. This led to modest chart success with the single "My Ever Changing Moods", which reached No. 29 on the US Billboard Hot 100 the following month. The song remains the group's and Weller's highest charting US single, including his period with the group The Jam and also as a solo artist.

Our Favourite Shop 
In the UK, the group reached the height of its popularity with the release of Our Favourite Shop, which entered the UK album chart at number 1 immediately following its release in June 1985 (only to be supplanted by Bryan Ferry's Boys and Girls a week later). It notched up a total of 13 weeks in the top 40 (including a re-entry in October), of which three weeks were spent in the top 10. The preceding single "Walls Come Tumbling Down" reached number 6 on the singles chart, while "Come to Milton Keynes" and "The Lodgers" reached number 23 and 13 respectively. A fourth single "Boy Who Cried Wolf" was released in the US and was a chart hit in New Zealand. In 2015, Our Favourite Shop was included in a list of 50 albums released in 1985 which, according to the NME, "still sound great today".

Together with "You're the Best Thing" (from Café Bleu) and "The Big Boss Groove", two songs from the album – "Internationalists" and "Walls Come Tumbling Down" – were played by the band at the UK Live Aid concert, where they appeared second in the running order at Wembley Stadium between Status Quo and the Boomtown Rats. The international exposure, however, did little to boost the group's career, and future commercial success was largely confined to their home country.

Further albums 
Following the live album Home and Abroad in 1986 the band released the album The Cost of Loving to mixed reviews in 1987. It reached number 2 on the albums chart. The single from the album, "It Didn't Matter" reached number 9 on the singles chart.

Commercial and critical decline 
From this point the band however had started to experience a critical and commercial decline. In 1988 Confessions of a Pop Group became the first of their albums that failed to reach the top 10. It entered the albums chart at number 15 and dropped out of the chart a few weeks later. The singles "Life at a Top People's Health Farm" and "How She Threw It All Away" also made brief chart appearances, peaking at number 28 and 41 respectively.

In 1989, members of The Style Council went under the name of King Truman to release a single on Acid Jazz titled "Like a Gun". This was unknown to Polydor, and the single was pulled from the shops three days prior to release. Acid Jazz founder Eddie Piller said: "The pair offered to make a single for my new label, which I'd just started with Radio 1 DJ Gilles Peterson as a side project. Talbot and Weller took pseudonyms Truman King and Elliott Arnold."

The Style Council split in 1989. About the break-up, Paul Weller said (in 1990):

The cover version of "Promised Land" (originally by Joe Smooth) was the only release which surfaced from the Modernism sessions at the time; however, the entire album was released in 1998, both independently and in a 5-CD box set, The Complete Adventures of The Style Council. After the split, Weller embarked on a successful solo career (which featured Steve White on drums, who had left the Style Council by the time Confessions of a Pop Group was released, having only played on a few of its tracks). Talbot and White released two albums as Talbot/White—United States of Mind (1995) and Off the Beaten Track (1996). Talbot and White then formed the Players with Damon Minchella and Aziz Ibrahim. White and Minchella went on to form Trio Valore whilst Talbot went touring with Candi Staton in 2009.

All the Style Council's UK releases (including singles, 12" maxis, albums, compact discs and re-issues thereof) featured the work of graphic designer Simon Halfon, who often collaborated with Weller to hone his ideas into a graphic form. Weller and Halfon began working together at the end of the Jam's career, and continue to work together on Weller's solo material.

In 1990, the band reunited (without Lee) for a one-off performance on Japanese TV.

2019 reunion  
Weller, Talbot, Lee and White met for a recording session of "It's a Very Deep Sea" in August 2019. The session was featured in the 2020 Sky Arts documentary Long Hot Summers: The Story of the Style Council, and a career-spanning audio compilation of the same name was released.

Politics 
In December 1984, Weller put together an ensemble called The Council Collective to make a charity record, "Soul Deep", initially to raise money for striking miners during a long-running industrial dispute, and subsequently also for the family of David Wilkie. The track featured the Style Council and a number of other performers, notably Jimmy Ruffin and Junior Giscombe. The song received airplay on BBC Radio 1 and was performed by the group on Top of the Pops, as well as (live) on Channel 4's The Tube.

In their lyrics, the Style Council took a more overtly political approach than the Jam, with tracks such as "Walls Come Tumbling Down!", "The Lodgers" and "Come to Milton Keynes" being deliberate attacks on 'middle England' and the Thatcherite policies of the UK government during the 1980s. In 1985, Weller was persuaded by Billy Bragg to let the Style Council play a leading role in Red Wedge, a youth-orientated political campaign associated with the British Labour Party. Although his views at the time have since been described as those of a "traditional British socialist", in 2014 Weller admitted the experience had left him feeling "exploited" by politicians, noting further that: "Before the Wedge, the Style Council had done a lot independently, raised a lot of money in benefits. But after the Wedge we were so disillusioned it all stopped. We were totally cynical about all of it." In a previous interview, whilst asserting that there was still "a place for outspokenness" in popular music, Weller had pointed out he was "first and foremost" a musician, and stated: "In the '80s, in the Style Council, we were involved with a lot of political things going on at that time. I think after a while that overshadowed the music a bit."

Discography

Studio albums
 Café Bleu (North America title: My Ever Changing Moods) (1984)
 Our Favourite Shop (North America title: Internationalists) (1985)
 The Cost of Loving (1987)
 Confessions of a Pop Group (1988)
 Modernism: A New Decade (1998)

Notes

References 

General

External links
 Mr Cool's Dream, The Complete History of The Style Council - "painstakingly accurate" - Paul Weller
 Shout to the Top, BBC Radio 2 documentary, broadcast August 2003
 
 

 
1983 establishments in England
1989 disestablishments in England
English new wave musical groups
English pop music groups
Geffen Records artists
Musical groups established in 1983
Musical groups disestablished in 1989
Polydor Records artists
Sophisti-pop musical groups
Political music groups
The Jam
Second British Invasion artists